Carson Williams may refer to:
 Carson Williams (electrical engineer), American noted for his light shows using Christmas lights
 Carson Williams (baseball), American baseball player